HAS University of Applied Sciences is an independent university of applied sciences, specialising in food, agriculture, horticulture, nature and environment. It is located in 's-Hertogenbosch, the regional capital of North Brabant and Venlo, Limburg. All bachelor programmes are accredited by the Dutch Flemish Accreditation Organisation. In 2017 there were around 3400 students enrolled at HAS University of Applied Sciences.

History 
On 13 October 1947 MLS (middelbare landbouwschool) was opened in Roermond, and  followed a year later by the MZS (middelbare landbouwschool). In 1956 the higher horticulture school was opened in Nijmegen, which  became part of HAS (hogere agrarische scholen gemeenschap) which formed the KNBTB (Koninklijke Nederlandse Boeren- en Tuindersbond) in 's-Hertogenbosch, North Brabant in 1962. This was later renamed to HAS University of Applied Sciences. In 2013 HAS University of Applied Sciences opened their 2nd location in Venlo, Limburg.

Studyprogrammes 
HAS University of Applied Sciences offers 9 Dutch-taught bachelor programmes and 3 English-taught Bachelor programmes.

Awards 
 2016 Elsevier 'Best University of Applied Sciences of the Netherlands' award
 2017 Keuzegids HBO: 2nd best University of Applied Sciences (medium size)
 2018 Keuzegids HBO: 2nd best University of Applied Sciences (medium size)

HAS Training and Consultancy 
HAS Training and Consultancy (Dutch: HAS Kennistransfer en Bedrijfsopleidingen), a partner of HAS University of Applied Sciences, offers research and consultancy services, training programs, courses and SPOC's for business and government organizations in the agribusiness and the food sector. HAS Training and Consultancy allows international students of HAS University of Applied Sciences to participate in research as part of their graduation projects, under the supervision of a consultant.

External links 
 HAS University of Applied Sciences - Student website
 HAS University of Applied Sciences - Corporate website
 HAS Knowledge Transfer and Training
  HAS student association

Vocational universities in the Netherlands
Agricultural universities and colleges in the Netherlands
Horticultural organizations
HAS University of Applied Sciences
HAS University of Applied Sciences